Ivan (Vano) Fedorovich Sturua (Georgian: ივანე (ვანო) თედორეს ძე სტურუა; December 28 1870 – April 13 1931) was a Georgian revolutionary and Soviet statesman.

Biography 
Sturua was born in to peasant family and worked as a railroad worker. From 1896 he became the Marxist social democratic movement. He joined of the Russian Social Democratic Labor Party in 1898 shortly after its founding.

He was one of the founders of the Tiflis Social Democratic Organization and the Tiflis Committee of the RSDLP. One of the leaders of strikes and rallies of Tiflis workers.

In 1900 he moved to Baku, became a member of the Baku Committee of the RSDLP. He worked in the illegal printing houses of the Central Committee of the RSDLP in Baku, St. Petersburg, and Vyborg. He met with Lenin on the affairs of the illegal printing house and publishing house of the Proletary newspaper. He was arrested several times and was in exile.

After the October Revolution in 1917, he was the chairman of the Kulash volost council of the Kutaisi province and the head of the organization of the RSDLP (B) in Samtredia. From 1918 to 1919 he was a member of the Kutaisi Committee of the Russian Communist Party (Bolsheviks) and a member of the Committee of the RCP (B) of the Western Caucasus. In 1919 and 1921 he was arrested by the government of independent Georgia.

After the establishment of Soviet power in Georgia, from May 1920 to 1921, he was a member of the Presidium of the Central Committee of the Communist Party of Georgia. From 1922 to 1924 he was the People's Commissar of Agriculture of the Georgian SSR.

From October 1921 to January 1923 he was chairman of the All-Georgian Central Executive Committee.

From March 1923 to April 13, 1931 he was Secretary of the Party Board of the Transcaucasian Regional Control Commission of the RCP (b).

Sturua died on April 13, 1931 in Tbilisi.

References

1870 births
1931 deaths
Politicians from Georgia (country)
Revolutionaries from Georgia (country)
Old Bolsheviks
Russian Social Democratic Labour Party members
Marxists from Georgia (country)